Lester Ellis (born 15 March 1965) is a British-born Australian former professional boxer. He is a five-time world champion, having also held the Australian and Commonwealth (twice) titles.

At the age of 19, In 1985, Ellis fought and beat then-reigning IBF super featherweight champion Hwan-Kil Yuh over fifteen rounds. In 1993 he won the vacant World Boxing Federation (WBF) welterweight title against Rocky Berg. Ellis faced and defeated Al Coquilla in 1994 for the vacant IBO light welterweight title. Ellis went on to win another two IBO world titles, both in different weight divisions. One in 1995 against Amado Cabato at lightweight and another at light middleweight against Eric Alexander.

Early life
Lester Ellis was born on 15 March 1965 in Blackpool, England to mother Sheila Ellis and his father Keith Ellis Snr. He is the youngest of three boys, with Keith Ellis being the oldest followed by Neil Ellis. The Ellis family migrated to Australia when Ellis was three on 2 October 1968.

At the age of five, Ellis's mother Sheila left the family home, leaving the three boys to live with Keith Snr. Ellis took this very hard and as a result he grew a hate towards authority figures and often did not attend school.

At the age of 12, Ellis began boxing training with Matthew Quinn at the Glengala Boxing Club in the Melbourne suburb of West Sunshine. Quinn had seen great potential in young, hateful Ellis and taught him how to harness his hate through the art of boxing.

Amateur boxing career
Under amateur boxing trainer Matthew Quinn and his brother Keith, Ellis had an outstanding amateur career with a total record of 50 fights for 45 wins. Ellis had collected four Australian titles and six Victorian titles throughout this period. Ellis turned professional in 1983

Professional career

Super featherweight IBF champion
In 1985, with a professional boxing record of 14 fights for 14 wins, 11 by KO at the age of 19, Ellis was offered to fight Hwan-Kil Yuh for the Super Featherweight International Boxing Federation (IBF) World Title. Ellis won this fight which went for the scheduled 15 rounds via split decision. Ellis successfully defended his title the same year against Rod Sequenan. Later that year on 12 July 1985 Ellis lost his IBF world championship via unanimous decision to ex training partner and then rival Barry Michael.

Professional boxing record

Boxing titles

Titles won by Ellis

1984-11-16 – Commonwealth (British Empire) Super Featherweight Title, opponent John Sichula

1985-02-15 – IBF Super Featherweight Title, opponent Hwan-Kil Yuh

1987-04-30 – Australian Lightweight Title, opponent Dale Artango

1988-03-16 – Australian light welterweight Title, opponent Pat Leglise

1988-08-04 – Commonwealth (British Empire) Light Welterweight Title, opponent Tony Laing

1993-02-19 – vacant World Boxing Federation Welterweight Title, opponent Rocky Berg

1994-12-03 – vacant International Boxing Organization Light Welterweight Title, opponent Al Coquilla

1995-03-10 – International Boxing Organization Lightweight Title, opponent Amado Cabato

1995-07-17 – vacant International Boxing Organization Light Middleweight Title, opponent Eric Alexander

Personal life
Ellis is married to wife Sharon, with whom he has four sons – Lester Jr, Jake (who is a professional boxer and promoter), Darcy and Demsey.
They live in the suburb of Taylors Hill, in Melbourne, Victoria. Ellis currently runs the Lester Ellis Fitness Academy from his home. Ellis's son Lester Ellis Jr has begun an acting career, recently starring as the title character's love interest in Ja'mie Private School Girl.

See also

List of boxing triple champions
List of boxing quadruple champions
List of boxing quintuple champions

References

External links

 

1965 births
Living people
People from Blackpool
English emigrants to Australia
Welterweight boxers
Lightweight boxers
International Boxing Federation champions
International Boxing Organization champions
Boxers from Melbourne
Australian male boxers
Commonwealth Boxing Council champions